The Donggyeongi, also called daeng gyeon (댕견) or Donggyeong gae (동경개), is a naturally bob-tailed dog breed originated in Korea.  It is an endangered breed of some 600 dogs in total, and has been protected as a natural heritage in South Korea since 2012 (Cultural Heritage Administration of Korea, number 540).

Etymology
Donggyeong (동경, 東京) was the name of the capital city of Shilla, a medieval Korean dynasty. Today the city is known as Gyeongju.

Appearance
The Donggyeongi has a very short or no tail, which is a prominent characteristic distinguished from other dog breeds in Korea. The Donggyeongi's facial features are similar to those of another dog type, the Korean Jindo, which is also a natural heritage dog in South Korea.

History
DNA analysis indicates that the Donggyeongi and the Korean Jindo were separated from a common ancestor about 900 years ago.

The feature of Donggyeongi was mentioned in old records such as Donggyeong Jabgi 《동경잡기(東京雜記)》(1845), Jeungbomunhyunbigo 《증보문헌비고(增補文獻備考)》(1770), and was also found in the clay dog dolls from the sixth century excavated around Gyeongju.  

In the past, there was a large population of the Donggyeongi in Gyeongju, but the dogs were slaughtered during the Japanese colonial era (1910-1945). There is an allegation that they might have been killed due to their similarity to ‘Komainu’, the dog figures kept in Japanese royal palaces or shrines. During the period, the number of dogs such as the Donggyeongi, the Jindo, and the Sapsali was decreased as they were slaughtered in mass to use their skins for winter coats. 

Even after the Korean liberation in 1945, the situation of the Donggyeongi was not good. The dogs were despised by general public: their lack of tails was regarded as bringing bad luck, or the dogs were mistaken as deformed. The number of the Donggyeongi was drastically decreased as a result. Hybridization with other breeds worsened the situation. Later misunderstanding on their tail shape was resolved, breed preservation efforts started, and the dogs were designated as a national heritage.

See also
 Old English Sheepdog
 Korean Jindo
 Sapsali
 Nureongi

References

External links
 

Spitz breeds
Dog breeds originating in Korea
Rare dog breeds